Ramit State Nature Reserve is situated in Tajikistan north east of Dushanbe. It consist of 16139 ha mountains and forests. 

The snow leopard is found in the reserve. Bukharan markhors (Capra falconeri heptneri),  endangered goat-antelopes, are kept in enclosures and released in the wild.

External links
 THE STATE NATURAL RESERVE "RAMIT"  auf www.tajikpark.tj

References

Nature reserves in Tajikistan